Royal Consorts of Pahang are the consorts of Sultan of the Malaysian State of Pahang. Throughout the history of Sultanate of Pahang, several Sultans practiced polygamy, but per Islamic marital jurisprudence, they did not have more than four wives in the same time. However, this list only included those who given the official royal consorts title.

There are two official title given to the royal consorts of Pahang based on their identity background. Tengku Ampuan of Pahang is the official royal consort title given to the consorts who those who are came from member of royal family. Meanwhile, the Sultanah of Pahang is the royal title reserves for those who are from commoner background.

Royal consorts of Pahang

Styles

In English, both Tengku Ampuan and Sultanah of Pahang is styled as Her Royal Highness. In Malay the Tengku Ampuan of Pahang is styled as Kebawah Duli Yang Maha Mulia, while the Sultanah of Pahang is styled as Duli Yang Maha Mulia.

Roles and duties
Like many spouses of heads of state, the royal consorts of Pahang has no stipulated role or duties in the Pahang State Constitution. However, she accompanies the Sultan of Pahang to official functions and state visits, as well as hosting visiting heads of state and their spouses.

See also
 Sultan of Pahang
 Yang di-Pertuan Agong
 Raja Permaisuri Agong

Pahang